St. Sebastian Goan High School is co-ed English medium school in Mumbai, recognized by the Maharashtra State Board of Education. A Christian school founded in 1925, it is supported and administered by the Roman Catholic Church, and under the religious jurisdiction of the Archbishop of Mumbai.

The school seeks primarily at the education of the Catholic Community and to the extent possible of the members of all other communities. The School stands for academic excellence, development of skills and character formation based on the love of God and the service of man as modeled in Jesus Christ, with a view to training citizens distinguished for their all round development and sincere commitment to God and country.

Alumni
 Atul Kale, actor, musician, and director
 Jeetendra Khanna, actor
 Rajesh Khanna, actor

References

External link
 

Catholic secondary schools in India
Christian schools in Maharashtra
High schools and secondary schools in Mumbai
Educational institutions established in 1925
1925 establishments in India